Thrice Married Woman is a 2013 South Korean weekend drama starring Lee Ji-ah, Uhm Ji-won, and Song Chang-eui. Written by Kim Soo-hyun, it aired on SBS from November 9, 2013 to March 30, 2014 on Saturdays and Sundays at 21:55 KST (12:55 GMT) for 40 episodes.

Plot
A story about a woman and her two adult daughters. Older sister Oh Hyun-soo is a pet products designer, while younger sister Oh Eun-soo gets remarried after a failed marriage.

Cast

Main characters 
Lee Ji-ah as Oh Eun-soo
Uhm Ji-won as Oh Hyun-soo
Song Chang-eui as Jung Tae-won
Ha Seok-jin as Kim Joon-goo
Seo Young-hee as Park Joo-ha
Jo Han-sun as Ahn Kwang-mo

Supporting characters
 Oh family
Han Jin-hee as Oh Byung-sik
Oh Mi-yeon as Lee Soon-shim
Kim Ji-young as Jung Seul-ki

 Jung family 
Kim Jung-nan as Jung Tae-hee
Kim Yong-rim as Mrs. Choi

 Kim family 
Kang Boo-ja as Son Bosal
Kim Yong-gun as Chairman Kim Myung-ye
Kim Ja-ok as Mrs. Son

 Extended cast
Oh Mi-hee as Chun Kyung-sook
Jang Hee-jin as Lee Da-mi
Son Yeo-eun as Han Chae-rin
Yang Hee-kyung as Yoo Min-sook (cameo)

Production
The drama underwent casting difficulties prior to filming. Han Ga-in and Chun Jung-myung were initially thought to be cast (Han in the leading role of Oh Eun-soo) and even attended the read-through, but were later nixed reportedly by popular but demanding drama writer Kim Soo-hyun. Kim Sa-rang was next considered for the role, but also didn't make the cut. After much media coverage, Lee Ji-ah was eventually cast.

It was also originally slated to be directed by Jung Eul-young, Kim Soo-hyun's longtime collaborator. But Jung dropped out due to health issues, and was replaced by producer Son Jung-hyun.

Awards and nominations

International broadcast
 - It aired on PPTV beginning October 13, 2015.

References

External links
 

Seoul Broadcasting System television dramas
Korean-language television shows
2013 South Korean television series debuts
2014 South Korean television series endings
Television shows written by Kim Soo-hyun (writer)
South Korean romance television series